The 1936 Marshall Thundering Herd football team was an American football team that represented Marshall College (now Marshall University) as a member of the Buckeye Athletic Association (BAA) during the 1936 college football season. In its first season under head coach Cam Henderson, the team compiled a 6–3–1 record, 2–2–1 against conference opponents, and outscored opponents by a total of 314 to 78. Herb Royer was the team captain.

Schedule

References

Marshall
Marshall Thundering Herd football seasons
Marshall Thundering Herd football